Lucky Joseph Vanous (born 11 April 1961) is an American model and actor. He became nationally known in 1994 after appearing in a series of commercials for Diet Coke.

Life and career

Vanous was born in Lincoln, Nebraska, and served in the United States Army 1st Ranger Battalion. Upon discharge, he studied at University of Nebraska at Lincoln. He was discovered while visiting Manhattan, and he moved there to model and continue his studies at New York University and Fordham University. He married Kristen Noel in 1989, and they were divorced in 1996.

Notable acting roles include playing Matt Dunning for a season on Pacific Palisades and playing Chance Bowman on 18 Wheels of Justice.

Filmography

References

External links

1961 births
Living people
Male models from Nebraska
University of Nebraska–Lincoln alumni
American male television actors